An area of the Italian governorate of Montenegro was occupied by German forces in September 1943, after the Armistice of Cassibile, in which the Kingdom of Italy capitulated and joined the Allies. Italian forces retreated from the governorate, and from neighbouring Albania. German forces occupied Montenegro, along with Albania, and the territory remained under German occupation until Axis forces evacuated in December 1944.

During the occupation the area was administered with Wilhelm Keiper as the general representative. He was initially subordinate to "Military Commander of Albania and Montenegro" Theodor Geib until spring 1944. After this time, Keiper's Montenegrin area command was independent and put directly under Commander-in-Chief in Southeast Europe Alexander Löhr. Ljubomir Vuksanović became head of the National Administrative Council established in October 1943, and officially appointed in November the same year. 

The Germans and their local collaborators in Montenegro fought against the Yugoslav Partisans. After the Germans withdrew from the Montenegro and evacuated towards Austria, the fascist leader Sekula Drljević attempted to create a government-in-exile in the neighbouring  Independent State of Croatia (NDH), which was a German quasi-protectorate. Drljević also created the Montenegrin National Army, a military force set up by him and the Croatian fascist leader Ante Pavelić. However, his government-in-exile, known as the "Montenegrin State Council", was dissolved after the fall of the NDH government. 

Montenegro was later taken over by the Yugoslav Partisans of Josip Tito, and became part of Democratic Federal Yugoslavia.

Footnotes

References
 
 
 

Montenegro in World War II 
Montenegro
1944 in Montenegro
Montenegro
1940s establishments in Montenegro
1944 establishments in Yugoslavia
1944 disestablishments in Yugoslavia
Collaboration with Nazi Germany‎